Jaan Maide, VR II/3 (30 May 1896 – 10 August 1945) was a senior Estonian Army officer who fought in World War I, the Estonian War of Independence and World War II. He was appointed Commander-in-Chief of the Estonian Military by Otto Tief's government in 1944.

Early life
Maide was born on 30 May 1896, in Vana-Kariste to Johann and Liso Maide.

Military career
Maide was drafted into the Imperial Russian Army in 1915. He graduated from a commissioned officer's academy in Kyiv as an ensign in 1916, and served with the Latvian Riflemen regiment from 1917 until 1918.

Following the Estonian Declaration of Independence, Maide joined the newly formed Estonian Army, where he was appointed commander of the 1st Company of the 6th Regiment. He commanded his unit during the Estonian War of Independence, and was promoted to lieutenant on 12 February 1920.

After the war, Maide stayed in the military. He finished General Staff officers' course in 1923, and was promoted to captain. From 1923 until 1927, he served as a general staff officer. In 1927, he was appointed Chief of Staff of the Estonian Defence League (Kaitseliit). On 24 February 1933, he was promoted to colonel. From 30 November 1934 until 30 November 1935, he commanded the Armoured Train Regiment, before returning to his former position as the Chief of Staff of the Estonian Defence League. On 1 February 1940, he was appointed commander of the newly established 4th Division, based in Viljandi.

Maide survived the first Soviet occupation. During the German occupation of Estonia in World War II, Maide was Chief of Staff, and later Commander of the Omakaitse (Home Guard), a militia based on the Estonian Defence League.

In wake of the German retreat and the Soviet offensive in September 1944, Otto Tief's government made one last attempt to restore Estonian independence. On 18 September 1944, Maide was appointed Commander-in-Chief of the Estonian Military, and promoted to major general on 21 September. Despite his attempts to reform the army, the plan to defend Estonia failed. Tallinn fell on 22 September 1944, and Maide himself was captured in Munalaskme on 24 October 1944.

Death
Maide was transported to the Butyrka prison in Moscow and executed on 10 August 1945.

Awards and decorations

Promotions

References

External links

1896 births
1945 deaths
People from Mulgi Parish
People from Kreis Pernau
Estonian major generals
Imperial Russian Army officers
Russian military personnel of World War I
Estonian military personnel of the Estonian War of Independence
Estonian people of World War II
Recipients of the Cross of Liberty (Estonia)
Recipients of the Military Order of the Cross of the Eagle, Class III
Recipients of the Order of the White Star, 3rd Class
Recipients of the Order of Lāčplēsis, 3rd class
Estonian prisoners of war
Estonian prisoners and detainees
Estonian people executed by the Soviet Union